University Laboratory High School may refer to:
Louisiana State University Laboratory School in Baton Rouge
University Laboratory High School (Urbana, Illinois)